In economics, a government monopoly or public monopoly is a form of coercive monopoly in which a government agency or government corporation is the sole provider of a particular good or service and competition is prohibited by law. It is a monopoly created, owned, and operated by the government. It is usually distinguished from a government-granted monopoly, where the government grants a monopoly to a private individual or company.

A government monopoly may be run by any level of government — national, regional, local; for levels below the national, it is a local monopoly. The term state monopoly usually means a government monopoly run by the national government.

Characteristics of state monopolies 
A state monopoly can be characterized by its commercial behavior not being effectively limited by the competitive pressures of private organisations. This occurs when its business activities exert an extensive influence within the market, can act autonomously of any competitors, and potential competitors are unable to successfully compete with it.

These activities have a major influence on the operational environment, when its trading activities are not subject to competitive forces inherent within free trading markets.  Therefore, this results in using its market dominance and influence to its advantage, in affecting how the market evolves over a long period of time. This is especially the case if the state monopoly controls access to vital inputs essential to operating within the market. 

The high degree of autonomy and ability to act independently in the market, has been demonstrated by the ability to alter relationships with its customers to its advantage, without negatively impacting its dominant market share.  A state monopoly’s ability to increase the price or quantity of goods and services provided, without a relational change in its own operating costs (coupled with maintaining this price or quantity at above a market clearing rate), demonstrates its ability to disregard any competitive forces within the market.  A state monopoly also retains the ability to reduce service value, or impose restrictive terms and conditions, without experiencing a loss in market share.

Market power 
A state monopoly’s market power and dominance can arise from its superior innovative capacity or greater performance.  However, any of the three following factors more broadly explain a state monopoly’s existence:

 A natural monopoly endures within the market, whereby the most efficient form of meeting demand is through the creation of a single government entity.
 The state monopoly is legislated for, with legislative instruments precluding competitive activities regarding the provision of goods or services.
 A poorly contestable market exists, with competition previously operating inefficiently despite the lack of legal restrictions.

Evidence of exercising market power 
The primary determinations of demonstrating the market power of state monopolies are:

 The monopoly’s economic income within the market is characterized by disproportionate returns on its existing asset base.  This income would be excessive, if it were not a result of its inefficient operations.
 There is a substantial difference between best practice benchmarks within private organisations, and the state monopoly’s own productive efficiency.  For example, a monopoly’s lack of productive efficiency could be resultant of gold plating of assets.
 The monopoly cross-subsidies incomes between loss-making activities and profitable activities.  If the aforementioned occurs through production or pricing behaviors, this suggests usual competitive forces characteristic of competitive markets are not being applied to the state monopoly.  A firm engaging in this practice under normal market conditions, would not survive in the long run.

Examples 
The most prominent example of the monopoly is law and the legitimate use of physical force. In many countries, the postal system is run by the government with competition forbidden by law in some or all services. Also, government monopolies on public utilities, telecommunications and railroads have historically been common, though recent decades have seen a strong privatization trend throughout the industrialized world.

In Nordic countries, some goods deemed harmful are distributed through a government monopoly. For example, in Denmark, Finland, Iceland, Norway, and Sweden, government-owned companies have monopolies for selling alcoholic beverages. Casinos and other institutions for gambling might also be monopolized. In Finland, the government has a monopoly to operate slot machines (see Veikkaus). Similar regimes for alcohol exist in the United States, where certain alcoholic beverage control states (ABC states), e.g. Pennsylvania and Virginia, maintain state-owned-and-operated monopolies on the sale of certain kinds of alcohol (typically distilled spirits and sometimes wine or beer). In these monopolies over harmful goods or services, the monopoly is designed to reduce consumption of the product by deliberately decreasing the efficiency of the market.

Governments often create or allow monopolies to exist and grant them patents. This limits entry and allow the patent-holding firm to earn a monopoly profit from an invention.

Health care systems where the government controls the industry and specifically prohibits competition, such as in Canada, are government monopolies.

In spite of privatisation a monopoly may still arise

Reforms to enhance competition 
Although state monopolies are sustained through legislative instruments, many major economies have seen efforts to reform the disproportionate market powers they sustain, to therefore enhance competition. This has been enacted through regulatory reforms (removing statutory restrictions to market competition) and structural reforms (including separating contestable elements of a state monopoly, and creating third party rights of access to natural monopolies).

Across all levels of governmental jurisdiction, both structural and regulatory reforms have been preferred, as it forces all market participants (both state monopolies and private industry) to respond to competitive pressures, as opposed to legislated regulatory structures. This has been observed to result in more optimal outcomes for an economy, as resource allocation is no longer directed by legislative instruments or regulatory authorities.     

Despite these reform efforts to promote competitive markets, regulatory and structural reforms struggle to overcome the entrenched market dominance of state monopolies.  This is resultant of advantages enjoyed by state monopolies, including first mover advantages.

Advantages 
The following advantages, may happen or not:

 Governement monopolies tend to comply with law (tax compliance, environnemental law, safety regulations)
 Prices of a good or service might be stabler, or at a set price.
 No economical dead-weight in advertising
 Greater and stabler governement income, than with a state owned company in a free market
 No pressure to drive down costs (race to the bottom), which can be seen as posing bases for more ethical business
 Can take over a private monopoly judged harmful.

Disadvantages 
Governement monopolies have traditional risks of usual monopolies:

 High prices can arise
 Abuse of market dominance

See also

Alcohol monopoly
Coercive monopoly
Crown corporation
Salt commission
Government-granted monopoly
Monopoly
Monopoly on violence
Nationalization
Natural monopoly
Private police
State monopoly capitalism

References

Market failure
Monopoly (economics)
Fiscal policy